The following is a list of notable people associated with Florida A&M University, located in the American city of Tallahassee, Florida. Florida A&M University is a public, four-year, historically black university located in Tallahassee, Florida. It is one of eleven institutions in Florida's State University System.

Education

Business and philanthropy

Politics, judicial, and public service

Entertainment

Athletics

Film, television, and performing arts

}}

}}

Music

Other notable alumni

See also
Florida A&M University Alumni

References

 
Florida Agricultural and Mechanical University alumni